Ceallach mac Guaire (died 665) was King of Uí Fiachrach Aidhne.

Ceallach was a son of the previous king, but reigned for only two years. In 664 "A great mortality prevailed in Ireland ... called the Buidhe Connail" and in 666 "A great plague raged" which killed hundreds in Connacht. However it is not known if either event led to Ceallach's demise.

References

 Irish Kings and High-Kings, Francis John Byrne (2001), Dublin: Four Courts Press, 
 Annals of Ulster at CELT: Corpus of Electronic Texts at University College Cork

People from County Galway
7th-century Irish monarchs
665 deaths
Year of birth unknown